DJ Hyper (born 23 February 1977) is a British DJ, producer and remixer, known for his use of live bass, guitars and uncompromising vocals. He has done remixes for artists such as BT and Paul Van Dyk and his music has been featured on TV and in trailers and video games. 

Hyper has releases on labels such as Distinct'ive Breaks Records, Bedrock Records, and Positiva Recordings. He has also performed as a band featuring The Prodigy's members Leeroy Thornhill and Jim Davies along with co-producer John Ross on drums. Their first studio album We Control advanced Hyper to the stages of festivals, including Glastonbury, The Glade, the Sziget Festival in Hungary and Coliseo Ciudad de Atarfe in Spain. Their second album Suicide Tuesday was released in September 2008.

Hyper is currently under his own Kilowatt label.

Music career 
Hyper released his debut album We Control in 2005, where he incorporated live instrumentation such as guitars and bass and fused it with his newer electronic sound.  The album led to a world tour, which included Fuji Rock Festival in Japan, Roskilde in Denmark and even Glastonbury in his native United Kingdom. In 2009, Hyper released the single "Pitch Bitch" with JHz on Kilowatt Recordings. The song was used on the trailer Warner Brothers Film The Losers. Also in 2009, Hyper released a remix of German electronic musician Pet's song "Cloud Nine".

In 2005, his music appeared in the video game Need for Speed Most Wanted and then again in the 2013 game Need for Speed Rivals. He also remixed The Sims 2's original score for the Nightlife expansion pack.

In 2006, he made a track for the video game MotorStorm entitled "Hot Rockin'", which seems to be a different take on his similar track "Replica". "Hot Rockin'" was made exclusively for MotorStorm and never officially released anywhere.

In 2008, his track "Replica" was featured in the video game Midnight Club: Los Angeles.

On 28 March 2011, Hyper released a new single, "The End", taken from his third album, The Panic, which itself was released in April 2011 via Distinctive Records.

In 2013 Hyper released his best-selling album to date, Lies, where he experimented with the power of dynamic and strings elements. The album received worldwide acclaim from artists and bloggers alike. In 2014, Hyper released an orchestral re-interpretation of 8 tracks featured in Lies to create “Symphony of Lies” in collaboration with Chris White. In 2018, "Spoiler" from Lies was featured in the E3 trailer for the video game Cyberpunk 2077 from CD Projekt Red.  

Hyper's music has been featured in television shows such as Orange is the New Black and Leftovers. It was also featured in the advertising campaign for the movie, Blade Runner 2049. 

Hyper has a singular focus on producing and crafting high end, polished sound tracks encompassing full orchestral pieces featuring dramatic instrumentation and the latest in electronic crossover. Hyper's approach to music curation is to create the defining moment of inspired sound that enhances motion picture content thus translating that moment into a lasting consumer sensory memory.

Discography

Studio albums
 2006: We Control
 2008: Suicide Tuesday
 2011: The Panic
 2012: The Panic (Instrumentals)
 2013: Lies
 2014: Symphony of Lies
 2015: Bully

Remix albums
 2000: Y3K: Deep Progressive Breaks
 2000: Y3K: Soundtrack to the Future
 2001: Bedrock Breaks
 2003: Bedrock Breaks - Fractured
 2004: Wired
 2006: Inthemix Is Six (Along with Bass Kleph)
 2007: Rewired

EPs
 2006: Twisted Emotion
 2007: Catnip
 2008: Centre Attraction
 2012: Machine
 2019: Cyberpunk
 2021: Control

Singles
 1999: "Blaze It Up"
 2003: "Catnip"
 2003: "Slapper"
 2004: "Outsider"
 2005: "Come With Me"
 2007: "No Rockstars"
 2007: "Worst Case Scenario" (Hyper Vs. Victory Pill)
 2009: "Pitch Bitch" (Kilowatt Recordings)
 2011: "The End"
 2011: "My World"

References

External links

Remixers
Club DJs
Breakbeat musicians
English DJs
English electronic musicians
English record producers
1977 births
Living people
Electronic dance music DJs